Pelecyphora is a genus of cacti, comprising 2 species. They originate from Mexico.

Pelecyphora is known for its medicinal properties and may have been utilized as a psychoactive in the same way as Lophophora williamsii. It is known as "Peyotillo".

Taxonomy
The two accepted species are:

Synonymy
At  genus level
The genus Encephalocarpus A.Berger has been brought into synonymy with Pelecyphora. 

At species level

The following are synonyms of species now placed outside of Pelecyphora:
Pelecyphora aselliformis var. pectinata (= Mammillaria pectinifera)
Pelecyphora pectinata (= Mammillaria pectinifera)
Pelecyphora pseudopectinata (= Turbinicarpus pseudopectinatus)
Pelecyphora valdeziana (= Turbinicarpus valdezianus)
Pelecyphora plumosa (= Turbinicarpus valdezianus)
Pelecyphora pulcherrima (= Turbinicarpus pseudopectinatus)

Psychoactivity
 Pelecyphora aselliformis: Mescaline (Less than 0.00002% in dry weight) Neal et al. 1972

Conservation status
Both P. aselliformis and P. strobiliformis are classified as being of Least Concern on the IUCN Red List,  however both species are contained in Appendix 1 of CITES species (Convention on International Trade in Endangered Species) as at June 2013.

References 

Cactoideae
Cactoideae genera